The fifty-eighth Connecticut House of Representatives district elects one member of the Connecticut House of Representatives. Its current representative is Democrat Thomas Arnone. The district consists of part of the town of Enfield, Connecticut, including Enfield's Thompsonville neighborhood.

List of representatives

Recent elections

External links 
 Google Maps - Connecticut House Districts

References

58